Payne Lake is located by Oxbow, New York. The outlet creek empties into the Oswegatchie River. Fish species present in the lake are largemouth bass, smallmouth bass, northern pike, walleye, yellow perch, tiger muskie, bluegill, and black crappie. There is a state owned hard surface ramp located west of Oxbow, New York and there is a 10-horsepower limit.

References 

Lakes of New York (state)
Lakes of Jefferson County, New York